The Canon PowerShot S110 is a high-end 12.1-megapixel compact digital camera announced and released in 2012. It was designed as the successor to the Canon PowerShot S100 in the S series of the Canon PowerShot line of cameras.

The S110 is very similar to the S100, with the addition of a multi-touch capacitive touchscreen and the omission of a GPS receiver in favor of a Wi-Fi transmitter being the biggest change.

Features

 12.1 megapixels
 JPEG (Exif 2.3) support
 Raw image file format; one of few "point and shoot" cameras to have raw formatting. (Note: Raw format is not available in Auto, Low Light, and SCN modes. Raw is available in Program,  (shutter priority),  (aperture priority), Manual, and Custom modes)
 MOV (QuickTime) (image data compressed in H.264, audio data in stereo Linear PCM).
 iFrame (1280×720, 30FPS)
 ISO sensitivity 80–12800 (in ⅓-step increments) and auto (up to ISO 1600).
 Full manual control
 Customizable Control Ring to control ISO, shutter speed, aperture, focus, or exposure compensation
 Five photo aspect ratios: 16:9, 3:2, 4:3, 1:1, 4:5
 Video features
 Recording Standard, Color Accent, Color Swap: 1920 × 1080 (24 frame/s), 1280 × 720 (30 frame/s), 640 × 480 (30)
 Recording Miniature Effect: 1280 × 720 (6 / 3 / 1.5 frame/s), 640 × 480 (6 / 3 / 1.5 frame/s)
 Recording Super Slow Motion: 640 × 480 (120 frame/s), 320 × 240 (240 frame/s)
 Continuous shooting, P mode continuous shooting: ~2.3 shot/s. High-speed burst mode in HQ continuous shooting: ~9.6 shot/s.
 Multi-touch capacitive touchscreen
 Internet connectivity using Wi-Fi

References

External links

 Regional websites:
 Canon Powershot S110 Asia
 Canon Powershot S110 USA
 Canon Powershot S110 Europe

S110
Cameras introduced in 2012